Charing Cross (sometimes informally abbreviated as Charing +, Charing X, CHX or CH+) is a London Underground station at Charing Cross in the City of Westminster. The station is served by the Bakerloo and Northern lines and provides an interchange with Charing Cross mainline station. On the Bakerloo line it is between Embankment and Piccadilly Circus stations and on the Northern line it is between Embankment and Leicester Square stations. The station is in fare zone 1.

Charing Cross was originally two separate stations, known for most of their existence as Trafalgar Square (on the Bakerloo line) and Strand (on the Northern line). The Bakerloo line platforms were opened by the Baker Street and Waterloo Railway in 1906 and the Northern line platforms by the Charing Cross, Euston and Hampstead Railway in 1907. In the 1970s, in preparation for the opening of the Jubilee line, the two earlier stations were connected together with new below ground passageways. When the Jubilee line platforms opened in 1979, the combined station was given the current name. Jubilee line services ended in 1999 when the line was extended to Stratford.

The station has entrances in Trafalgar Square, Strand, Villiers Street, Adelaide Street, William IV Street and in the mainline station. It is close to the National Gallery, the National Portrait Gallery, Admiralty Arch, St Martin-in-the-Fields, Canada House, South Africa House, the Savoy Hotel, The Mall, Northumberland Avenue and Whitehall.

History

Planning
From the 1860s to the 1900s numerous schemes for underground railways through central London were proposed, often using similar routes. Many of the schemes submitted to Parliament for approval as private bills included proposals for lines through the Charing Cross area with stations serving the South Eastern Railway's (SER's) Charing Cross mainline terminus and the area around Trafalgar Square.

1860s and 1870s

The first proposal came before Parliament in 1864, a year after the opening of the Metropolitan Railway, the world's first underground railway, and the year the mainline station opened. The North Western and Charing Cross Railway (NW&CCR) proposed a line in a cut-and-cover tunnel between the London and North Western Railway's terminus at Euston and Charing Cross. The  was to have its own station on the north side of Strand before it came to the surface alongside the main line station and connected to the  tracks on Hungerford Bridge. The railway was approved in July 1864.

The following year, the Waterloo and Whitehall Railway (W&WR) received permission to construct a short railway between Waterloo station and a station at the western end of Great Scotland Yard at the junction with Whitehall. The line was to be a pneumatic railway with the carriages sucked and pushed through the tunnels like a piston by fans at Waterloo. Construction works began for the ends of the cut and cover tunnels on each side of the River Thames and part of the cast-iron cylinder that was to be sunk into a trench dredged into the bed of the river.

Progress on both railways was halted in the Panic of 1866, a major crash in the London and international stock markets that led to the collapse of a number of banks and prevented funds being raised to continue the works. The  was liquidated in 1868, and the  plans were abandoned in 1869.

The  plans were revived with minor changes by the Euston, St Pancras and Charing Cross Railway in 1870. Parliamentary approval was granted in 1871 and the company changed its name to the London Central Railway, but the scheme was again unable to raise sufficient funds. It was abandoned in 1874.

1880s

In 1881, the Central Metropolitan Railway proposed a cut-and-cover line running from Parliament Square to St Pancras. At the southern end, the line was to run under Whitehall, Trafalgar Square and St Martin's Lane, though the location of the station was not recorded. The section under Whitehall was opposed by the government and it was removed so that the line was to terminate at Charing Cross, but the whole scheme was rejected by Parliament in 1882.

Another proposal in 1881 was the Charing Cross and Waterloo Electric Railway (CC&WER). The proposal was similar to the  17 years earlier; a short line running in iron pipes sunk into the river bed connecting Waterloo station to the north side of the river, this time to a station  under Trafalgar Square. The scheme was the first in the UK to propose the use of electric traction for its trains and was supported by Sir William Siemens whose electrical engineering company Siemens Brothers was to provide the electrical equipment. The  was approved in August 1882. A proposal to extend the route to the City of London was submitted to Parliament later that year, but was withdrawn the following year as the company struggled to raise funds. The plan was rejected. William Siemens died in 1883 and the  plan was abandoned in 1885.

In 1884, proposals were made for two cut-and-cover lines to link Charing Cross with one of the northern terminals. The first proposal, the Charing Cross and Euston Railway, proposed a line between those two stations. At Charing Cross a terminal station was to be provided under Villiers Street which was to be closed to allow a separate branch to rise to the surface to cross the river on a new bridge adjacent to Hungerford bridge before connecting to the  tracks south of the river. The bill was withdrawn in February 1885. The second proposal, the London Central Subway), proposed connecting Charing Cross and King's Cross. The government's Office of Works objected to the proposed alignment on the north side of Trafalgar Square because it believed the tunnels would compromise the foundations of the National Gallery. The bill was withdrawn in April 1885.

Also in 1884, the King's Cross, Charing Cross and Waterloo Subway submitted a proposal to construct a line linking the three mainline terminals in its name. Unlike the earlier schemes and those of the Charing Cross and Euston Railway and London Central Subway, the company planned to construct its line at a deeper level with the tunnels constructed using a tunnelling shield and lined with cast-iron segments. The stations were to be constructed using the cut-and-cover technique with one platform above the other. Two stations were to be constructed close to Charing Cross: one to the south at the junction of Northumberland Avenue and Northumberland Street and one to the north in St Martin's Place. The bill was withdrawn in May 1885.

In 1889, the North and South London Subway was proposed. It was to connect Camden Town and Elephant & Castle, and proposed a station north of the National Gallery at the junction of Charing Cross Road and Green Street (now Irving Street). The bill was announced, but was not submitted to parliament.

1890s

Following the successful opening in 1890 of the City and South London Railway (C&SLR), the first deep-level tube railway and the first underground railway using electric traction, a number of railways were proposed in London to be constructed and operated by similar means. In 1891, two bills were submitted for tube railways that were to serve Charing Cross: the Baker Street & Waterloo Railway (BS&WR) and the Hampstead, St Pancras & Charing Cross Railway (HStP&CCR).

The former company's station was to be under Trafalgar Square and the latter's was to be at the junction of King William Street (now William IV Street) and Agar Street with a pedestrian subway under Strand to the forecourt of the mainline station. The  and the  would become the first two lines through Charing Cross to be completed, though it was several years before construction began on either line.

In 1896, the City and West End Railway proposed a route running between Cannon Street in the City of London and Hammersmith via the West End and Knightsbridge. A station for Charing Cross was to be provided at King William Street. The company's east–west route would have been competition for a number of other lines that had been permitted but which had not yet opened: the under construction Central London Railway (CLR), the Metropolitan District Railway's (MDR's) proposed deep level line and the Brompton and Piccadilly Circus Railway's (B&PCR's) line. Lobbying from these companies led to the City and West End Railway bill being rejected in April 1897.

The final new scheme of the 1890s was the Paddington and Charing Cross Railway's proposal in 1897 to link these two mainline stations. Its station at Charing Cross was to be under and parallel with Craven Street on the south side of the main line station. When the bill was first considered in January 1898, the promoters failed to attend Parliament to support it and the bill was declared "dead".

Also in 1897, the  submitted a bill to change the route of the final section of its line. Instead of turning east at the end of Charing Cross Road to Agar Street and Strand, the route was revised to run south past Trafalgar Square to end at a station under Craven Street. The change was approved in July 1898 and the previous routing was abandoned.

1900s

1901

Proposals for the 1901 parliamentary session that planned to serve Charing Cross included three new lines and the extension of one already approved.

The Charing Cross, Hammersmith and District Railway (CCH&DR) proposed a line from just north of Charing Cross to Hammersmith via Knightsbridge and Kensington. Two stations were planned around Trafalgar Square: one to the north-east at Bedfordbury with its entrance probably to be located at the junction of Agar Street and Strand; the other on the south side of the Square.

The Piccadilly and City Railway (P&CR) proposed a line from Piccadilly Circus to Cannon Street. It planned to connect to other companies' lines at each end. The P&CR's station at Charing Cross was to be on the east side of Adelaide Street at the junction with Strand.

The Victoria, City and Southern Electric Railway proposed a line from Pimlico to Peckham Rye connecting Victoria with the City, Southwark and south-east London. Its tunnels would have run between Whitehall and Strand with a station to the south-west of the mainline station. The promoters failed to appear before the parliamentary committee and the bill was declared "dead" in January 1901.

The  submitted a bill for an extension of its approved route south from Charing Cross to Westminster and Victoria.

To review all these bills and the others submitted for underground lines in London, Parliament established a joint committee under Lord Windsor. By the time the committee had produced its report, the 1901 parliamentary session was almost over so the promoters of the bills were asked to resubmit them for the 1902 session.

1902

The 1902 session saw an increase in the number of bills submitted for tube railways in London. To manage the workload of reviewing all of the bills, two joint committees were established, one under Lord Windsor and the other under Lord Ribblesdale.

The Ribblesdale Committee considered the  bills and rejected the extension to Victoria as being not in compliance with Commons standing orders. It was approved in November 1892.

The other bills affecting Charing Cross were considered by the Windsor Committee. Several of these involved tunnels between Charing Cross and Piccadilly Circus and, either independently or in conjunction with other companies' proposals, formed parts of routes connection Charing Cross to Hammersmith. Although it did not plan a station in the vicinity of Strand or Trafalgar Square, the  proposal for a short line to connect its planned station at Piccadilly Circus and the  planned deep-level platforms at its Charing Cross station would have required tunnels to run one above the other, south under Adelaide Street and Craven Street on the south-west side of the mainline station before turning east into Northumberland Avenue and north under Victoria Embankment to connect to the  planned tunnels. The link was rejected on engineering grounds.

The  proposal was for a second line to connect its two existing termini at Shepherds' Bush and Bank via a more southerly route to form a deep-level loop. At Charing Cross, the new line would have run under Strand, then north-west past Trafalgar Square towards Piccadilly Circus. The entirety of the  scheme and the majority of the  scheme, including all of the southern loop line, were rejected by parliament.

The  proposal was amended from the previous year to run beyond Piccadilly Circus to Hammersmith. This required its platforms at Charing Cross to be deeper than in its previous scheme. The  was promoted by the London United Tramways (LUT) and also planned to run between Hammersmith and Charing Cross. Approaching from the west beneath The Mall, at Charing Cross the line was to form a loop running from the Duke of York Column at the south end of Waterloo Place, under Trafalgar Square to the corner of Duncannon Street and Strand before turning south to run under the mainline station to the junction of Northumberland Avenue and Whitehall Place before running west to complete the loop. Its station would have been located on the loop.

The  proposals were modified in a number of ways before bills were ready at the end of July 1902 for a third and final reading. The  planned route was similar to that of the -owned . Under Speyer Brothers' control, the  withdrew the  bill and the remainder of the  proposals failed.

1903–1906
Fewer tube railway bills were proposed for the 1903 parliamentary session. The  bill provided for the purchase of additional land for its station. The  resubmitted its previous loop line bill unaltered expecting that the collapse of the  plans would improve its chance of success.

The  proposed a modification of the previous year's  for a branch southwards from Piccadilly Circus. This time the branch would run under Leicester Square with platforms under King William Street and a station building at the junction of Agar Street and Strand. Between Piccadilly Circus and Ludgate Circus, the route was similar to the  loop line proposal.

Neither of the bills proceeded as the Royal Commission on London Traffic was established on 10 February 1903 to consider future development of transport in London. During its deliberations consideration of any new proposals was suspended. After the Commission issued its report on 17 July 1905, an attempt was made to revive a bill that had been submitted too late for the 1903 session and had been waiting parliament's consideration since February 1903. A station was planned between Agar Street and Bedford Street. The bill was rejected for not complying with standing orders in 1905, and resubmitted for the 1906 session with the station moved to the junction of Agar Street and Strand. Again the bill was rejected for procedural reasons and it was not presented again.

Construction and opening

Construction of the  began in August 1898, with the boring of the tunnels under the River Thames beginning in February 1899. At the end of 1900, the collapse of the  parent company, London & Globe Finance Corporation, put the railway company in financial difficulties. Tunnelling stopped in May 1901 with most of the running tunnels complete between Waterloo and the south end of Regent Street. At Trafalgar Square, the station tunnels had been excavated. Works restarted under the new owners and 80 per cent of the tunnels were complete by March 1903.

Construction of the  began in September 1903. Tunnelling under the mainline station was done in compressed air to prevent any damage from ground movements. The railway had permission to construct the underground station's ticket hall under part of the  station's forecourt, but it was to be done from below to avoid disrupting the station. In December 1905, the roof of the mainline station collapsed and the station closed for three months for rebuilding. Works to construct a lift shaft and form the walls around the ticket hall were carried out with a grid of steel beams placed across the site onto which the forecourt surface was reconstructed. Excavation of the ticket hall and a second lift shaft were carried out from the roofed-over space.

There was nowhere to place a surface building, so the station had a sub-surface ticket hall under the square. The ticket hall had three entrances: one at the south-east corner of the central area of the square, one on the corner of Strand and one on the east side of the square. Lifts manufactured by the Otis Elevator Company and a spiral stair connected the platforms and ticket hall. Platform tiling at Trafalgar Square station was started in early 1904.

Trafalgar Square station opened when the  opened between Baker Street and Kennington Road on 10 March 1906.

Extension and modifications

The  and  stations were not connected below ground. For the opening of the extension, the  station was renamed Charing Cross (Strand) with the new station to the south being named Charing Cross (Embankment).

Beginning in 1924, a number of central London stations were modernised with escalators being provided to replace lifts. At Trafalgar Square, two Otis escalators came into use on 13 April 1926, doubling the capacity of the station. The ticket hall was modernised and extended to use the space previously occupied by the lifts and a passage was constructed to a new entrance in Cockspur Street on the south side of the square. The improvements to the ticket hall included the installation of automatic ticket machines. Strand station retained its lifts.

War and new plans
In September 1938 during the Sudeten Crisis, when it appeared that war with Germany was imminent, the tunnels of the Bakerloo and Northern lines under the River Thames were closed and sealed with concrete to protect the system from flooding that might be caused by a bomb falling in the river and breaching the tunnels. As a consequence, between 27 September 1938 and 8 October 1938 both Trafalgar Square and Strand stations were closed. After the crisis was resolved and the concrete seals were removed, works began on installing flood gates to protect the lines each side of the river. Following Germany's ultimatum to Poland on the Polish Corridor, the Northern line tunnels were again plugged on 1 September 1939 and were not reopened until 17 December 1939, once the flood gates had been installed.

On 12 October 1940, a German bomb fell on Trafalgar Square station killing seven people sheltering from the Blitz.

In 1944, The County of London Plan recommended replacing the mainline station with one below ground served by two routes: Route A, running between Clapham and New Cross via Victoria station, Blackfriars, Cannon Street and Wapping and Route B, a loop line linking Waterloo, Charing Cross, Blackfriars, Cannon Street and London Bridge. The location of the station was not specified.

A post-war report in 1946 rejected the idea of moving the mainline station entirely underground, but did propose several new lines running in tunnels within the central area including two serving Charing Cross. Route 5 (running between Hither Green and Old Oak Common) and Route 9 (running between Raynes Park and Clapton) were mainline routes proposed to connect to existing surface lines to allow main line trains to cross London without using the terminals. A third route, Route 12A, was a London Underground route running between Golders Green and Waterloo. It was to run beneath the existing Northern line tunnels to relieve congestion on the line.

None of these proposals were developed by the mainline railway companies, the London Passenger Transport Board or their successor organisations.

In 1956, the London County Council planned to construct pedestrian subways from the ticket hall of Strand station under Strand to Duncannon Street and Adelaide Street with a travelator in the main passage from the station and escalators from the subways to street level. A separate subway from the north side of Strand to the ticket hall and another to connect to the subways from Trafalgar Square station were also proposed. The works were not carried-out.

Reconstruction and integration for the Jubilee line

Throughout the 1950s and early 1960s consideration was given to various routes connecting north-west and south-east London via the West End and the City of London including proposals to extend the Bakerloo line south-east from Elephant & Castle to Camberwell and beyond. Planning of the Victoria line had the greater priority and it was not until after construction of that line started that detailed planning began for the new line, first called the Fleet line in 1965 as it was planned to run in an east–west direction along Fleet Street to the City of London and then south of the River Thames to Lewisham. Lack of funding meant that only the first stage of the proposed line, from Baker Street to Charing Cross, received royal assent in July 1969; funding was agreed in August 1971.

Tunnelling began in February 1972 and was completed by the end of 1974. In 1977, during construction of the stations, the name of the line was changed to the Jubilee line, to mark the Queen's Silver Jubilee that year.

At Charing Cross, the tunnels for the Jubilee line were aligned east–west beneath Strand with the running tunnels passing under the Bakerloo line and Northern line tunnels and the new Jubilee line platforms between the two. A cross-over junction to the west of the platforms enabled trains to terminate and start from both platforms. In preparation for the second stage of the line continuing to Aldwych and beyond, the running tunnels were continued east of the new platforms at Charing Cross, running beneath Strand to end at Wellington Street. The original Strand station ticket hall beneath the forecourt of the mainline station was enlarged under the forecourt and under Strand itself. To enable this, piles were installed in the forecourt in January 1973 to support a steel umbrella structure erected over the area during the Easter weekend in 1973. The foundations of the Eleanor cross in the station forecourt also needed to be underpinned to avoid it being damaged during the excavations. With the enlargement of the ticket hall, linking subways were constructed to new entrances in Villiers Street, on the north side of Strand, in Adelaide Street and in William IV Street.

The new platforms were connected to both of the original stations, forming one new station. Strand station closed on 16 June 1973 so that an escalator shaft could be constructed diagonally through the original lift shafts down to an intermediate concourse. At Trafalgar Square station, the existing concourse at the bottom of the 1926 escalator shaft was enlarged to connect to a new passage which ran eastwards towards another concourse at the top of a second set of two escalators and a fixed stair down to the western end of the Jubilee line platforms. Although not originally intended for passenger use, part of one of these became the interchange passage between the Bakerloo and Northern lines. A new electrical sub-station to supply the line was installed at the bottom of one of Strand station's redundant escalator shafts. Once the structural work to enlarge the ticket hall was completed, the umbrella structure was removed in October 1975.

Work on fitting out the tunnels and stations began at the end of 1975, but serious delays in the progress of the work prevented the line from opening in 1978 as intended. Tracks and signals were commissioned and trial running of trains on the line began on 14 August 1978, but work on the station was delayed by industrial action at the escalator contractor.

The official opening of the line by Prince Charles took place on 30 April 1979, starting with a train journey from Green Park to Charing Cross. The Jubilee line opened to the public on 1 May 1979. On the same day the Northern line service was reinstated and the combined station was named Charing Cross.

The new Northern line and Jubilee line ticket hall was decorated in lime green and blue moulded plastic panels with black tiles. Lime green was also used for the wall tiling of the Jubilee line platforms which was combined with decorative panels featuring images of Lord Nelson and Trafalgar Square by David Gentleman. Gentleman also designed the decorative scheme for the Northern line platforms. These have panels featuring a continuous mural illustrating, in the style of black and white woodcuts, the construction of the Eleanor Cross. The Bakerloo line platforms and ticket hall were not redecorated at the same time as those of the other two lines. This was carried out in 1983 when decorative panels for the platforms featuring artwork from the National Gallery and National Portrait Gallery were installed.

Closure of Jubilee line platforms
Although permission had been granted in 1971 and 1972, work on the Fleet line's stages 2 and 3 did not proceed and it was not until 1992 that an alternative route was approved. The Jubilee line extension took the line south of the River Thames via Waterloo. Due to the tightness of the curves required and speed restrictions that would have been needed it was impractical to reach Waterloo from Charing Cross. New tunnels branching from the original route south of Green Park would be constructed, and the line to Charing Cross would be closed. Tunnelling began in May 1994 and the new extension opened in stages starting at Stratford in the east, with services to Charing Cross ending on 19 November 1999 and the final section between Green Park and Waterloo opening the following day. The Jubilee line platforms were closed and walls constructed across the intermediate concourses at the top of the two banks of escalators.

The Jubilee line platforms are still used by Jubilee line trains as sidings to reverse trains from southbound to northbound. To do so southbound trains terminate and disembark passengers at Green Park station and run empty to one of the Charing Cross platforms.

Proposal for connection to Docklands Light Railway
In July 2005, a report, DLR Horizon 2020 Study, for the Docklands Light Railway (DLR) examined "pragmatic development schemes" to expand and improve the DLR network between 2012 and 2020. One of the proposals was an extension of the DLR from Bank to Charing Cross. The unused tunnels under Strand would be enlarged to accommodate the larger DLR trains. In 2011, the DLR published a proposal to continue the extension to Victoria via Green Park. No further work has been done on these proposals.

Ticket hall refurbishment and closure of subways

In 2016 and 2017, the two ticket halls were separately closed for refurbishment. In each one, interior finishes and lighting were replaced and new ticket barriers were installed. The Northern line ticket hall closed in September 2016 and was scheduled to reopen in July 2017, but reopened a month earlier. Following its reopening, Northern line Night Tube services began stopping at the station on 30 June 2017. They had been introduced on the line in November 2016, but did not serve Charing Cross until the Northern line ticket hall reopened.

In June 2020 a planning approval was granted to close the subways to Adelaide Street, William IV Street and the north side of Strand and convert the space to office and retail use linked to the building above.

Use in media
As the Jubilee line platforms and track are maintained by TfL for operational reasons, they can be used by film and television makers requiring a modern Underground station location.

Films, television production and videos that have been shot at Charing Cross include:
The Fourth Protocol (1987)
Creep (2004)
Cry (2004), Alex Parks (music video)
28 Weeks Later (2007)
The Bourne Ultimatum (2007)
Flood (2007)
The Escapist (2008)
Spooks (2009)
Skyfall (2012)
Thor: The Dark World (2013)
Paddington(2014)Whisky Story (2015), Example (music video)The Rook (2019)Killing Eve'' (2019)

Services and connections

Services
Sometimes abbreviated as "Charing X" or "CX" on trains or timetables, the station is in Travelcard Zone 1, between Piccadilly Circus and Embankment on the Bakerloo line and Leicester Square and Embankment on the Northern line. On weekdays, Bakerloo line trains typically run every 2–2½ minutes between 05:43 and 00:29 northbound and 05:57 and 00:34 southbound; on the Northern line trains typically run every 2½–3½ minutes between 05:42 and 00:38 northbound and 05:56 00:34 southbound.

Connections
 London Buses routes 6, 9, 11, 12, 15, 24, 29, 87, 88, 91, 139, 159, 176 and 453 and night routes N3, N5, N9, N11, N15, N20, N21, N26, N29, N41, N44, N87, N89, N91, N97, N109, N113, N136, N155, N199, N279, N343, N550 and N551 serve Trafalgar Square and Charing Cross station.

Notes and references

Notes

References

Bibliography

External links

 The Charing Cross-Embankment-Strand conundrum explains the various names of the tube stations in this area.
 London's Abandoned Tube Stations – Charing Cross
 London Transport Museum Photographic Archive
 
 
 
 
  Note sign pointing way to Bakerloo line.
 
 
 
 Platform murals
 
 
 

Tube stations in the City of Westminster
Former Baker Street and Waterloo Railway stations
Former Charing Cross, Euston and Hampstead Railway stations
Railway stations in Great Britain opened in 1906
Railway stations in Great Britain opened in 1907
Bakerloo line stations
Northern line stations
London Underground Night Tube stations